Kurt Rudolph (3 April 1929 – 13 May 2020) was a German researcher of Gnosticism and Mandaeism.

Education 
Born in Dresden, Rudolph studied Protestant theology, religion, history and Semitology at the universities of Greifswald and Leipzig in the years 1948 to 1953. Subsequently, for six years, he was research assistant while he worked in parallel towards doctorates in theology and religious history. In 1961, he received his habilitation in religious history and comparative religion.

Career 
During his work at universities in Leipzig, Chicago, Marburg and Santa Barbara, he acquired an international reputation as an expert in Gnosticism and Mandaeism. He also occupied himself with Islam and methodological questions in religious studies.

His priority was the creation of a religious studies discipline that was independent of theology. Rudolph stressed that religious studies must be a rational science and be subjected to methodological atheism. This theory, which was initially fiercely contested in German religious studies, is now largely a matter of consensus.

After his retirement in 1994, Rudolph received honorary doctorates in Århus and Leipzig. In his past years he lived in Marburg.

Works 
 Die Mandäer I - Das Mandäerproblem Vandenhoek 1960
 Die Mandäer II - Der Kult Vandenhoek 1961
 Theogonie, Kosmogonie und Anthropogonie in den mandäischen Schriften Vandenhoeck 1965, 
 Die Gnosis - Wesen und Geschichte einer spätantiken Religion Leipzig 1977, (4th edition. Vandenhoeck 2005), 
 Gnosis und Spätantike Religionsgeschichte, (collected essays, Brill 1997)

References

External links 
 
 Institute of Religious Studies, University of Leipzig 
 Bullet point biography 

1929 births
2020 deaths
Writers from Dresden
German historians of religion
20th-century German Protestant theologians
University of Greifswald alumni
Leipzig University alumni
Academic staff of Leipzig University
University of Chicago faculty
Academic staff of the University of Marburg
University of California, Santa Barbara faculty
Academic staff of Aarhus University
Historians of Gnosticism
German male non-fiction writers
Scholars of Mandaeism
Translators from Mandaic